John N. Pederson (May 18, 1919 – October 7, 1976) was an American football, skiing, and swimming coach, educator, and civic leader. He served as the head football coach at Arizona State College at Flagstaff—now known as Northern Arizona University—from 1951 to 1953, compiling a record of 7–16.

Pederson was born on May 18, 1919, in Milwaukee. He attended high school in West Allis, Wisconsin and then moved on to La Crosse State Teachers College—now known as the University of Wisconsin–La Crosse—where he played college football as a center and was a member of the school's swimming team. He served in the United States Army during World War II, enlisting as a private in 1941. He served two years with the ski troops at Camp Hale in Colorado and then overseas, before being discharged as a first lieutenant in 1945.

Pederson coached skiing and swimming at the University of Colorado Boulder in 1945–46 while earning a Master of Education degree. In 1949, he went to the Indiana University Bloomington to work as an assistant football coach, teach swimming, and pursue a Doctor of Physical Education degree. In the spring of 1950, Pederson was hired by Arizona State College at Flagstaff as head skiing coach and line coach for the football team to assist head coach Ben Reiges.

Pederson was elected to the city council of Flagstaff, Arizona, in 1964 and served a two-year term as a councilman. He remained a member of Northern Arizona University's physical education department faculty until his death on October 7, 1976. He died at the activity center on the university's campus in Flagstaff, after suffering a heart attack while playing racquetball.

Head coaching record

Football

References

1919 births
1976 deaths
American football centers
Northern Arizona Lumberjacks football coaches
Wisconsin–La Crosse Eagles football players
College men's swimmers in the United States
College skiing coaches in the United States
College swimming coaches in the United States
Northern Arizona University faculty
Arizona city council members
Indiana University Bloomington alumni
University of Colorado Boulder alumni
United States Army officers
United States Army personnel of World War II
Sportspeople from Milwaukee
People from West Allis, Wisconsin
Coaches of American football from Wisconsin
Players of American football from Milwaukee
Military personnel from Wisconsin